Post-amendment to the Tamil Nadu Entertainments Tax Act 1939 on 1 April 1958, Gross jumped to 140 per cent of Nett  Commercial Taxes Department disclosed 69 crore in entertainment tax revenue for the year.

A list of films produced in the Tamil film industry in India in 1991 by release date:

Movies 1991

References

1991
Lists of 1991 films by country or language
1990s Tamil-language films
1991 in Indian cinema